Lewis Hook (born 18 August 1996) is an English ice hockey player for Elite Ice Hockey League (EIHL) side Belfast Giants and the British national team.

He represented Great Britain at the 2021 IIHF World Championship and 2022 IIHF World Championship.

References

External links

1996 births
Living people
Belfast Giants players
Coventry Blaze players
English ice hockey left wingers
Nottingham Panthers players
Milton Keynes Lightning players
Peterborough Phantoms players
Sportspeople from Peterborough
British expatriate ice hockey people
English expatriate sportspeople in Austria
Expatriate ice hockey players in Austria